Acidithiobacillia is a class of the "Pseudomonadota". Its type order, the Acidithiobacillales, was formerly classified within the Gammaproteobacteria, and comprises two families of sulfur-oxidising autotrophs, the Acidithiobacillaceae and the Thermithiobacillaceae, which in turn include the genera Acidithiobacillus and Thermithiobacillus

References

External links
 Encyclopedia of Life: Acidithiobacillia